Choorian ( meaning "Bangles") is a Pakistani franchise films. The no. of films is 2 which is released in 1963 and 1998. Both films in a Punjabi language.

Films

Choorian (1963 film)
Choorian  is a 1963 black and white Pakistani Punjabi language super-hit musical film.

It was the first Pakistani film to be given the "only for adults" rating by the censors. The film, when seen from today's standards, would seem quite "clean" to most audiences. But at the time, wearing body-baring dresses was taboo in Pakistan.

Actress Nasira, the famous Pakistani "vamp", wore dresses that exposed more than what was permissible at that time.

Cast (1963)
Laila
Akmal Khan
Nasira
Razia
Asif Jah
Ajmal
A. Shah Shikarpuri
Mazhar Shah
Rangeela
Fazal Haq
Saqi
Gulrez
Mehboob Kashmiri
Zarrin Panna

Film's music and super-hit film songs of 1963 film
This film had music by music director Tufail Farooqi , film song lyrics by Baba Alam Siaposh

Choorian (1998 film)
Choorian 2 or Choorian (1998) ( meaning "Bangles") is a 1998 Pakistani Punjabi-language action - romance - crime film directed by Syed Noor & produced by Haji Faqir Mohammad. Film stars Moammar Rana and Saima. Choorian is Pakistan’s third highest-grossing domestic film of all-time.

The film has a simple love story. A city boy Bakhtu (Moammar Rana) is sent to live with his uncle back in the village. He soon falls in love with his uncle's older daughter Billo (Saima). Billo is a servant in her own house, and does all the chores which are overseen by Bahar, her stepmother. Bahar treats her like a slave throughout the movie while her two daughters live like queens.

Cast (1998 film)
 Moammar Rana as Bakhtu
 Saima Noor as Billo
 Muzaffar Adeeb
 Bahar Begum
 Babar Butt
 Shafqat Cheema
 Sardar Kamal
 Abid Khan
 Irfan Khoosat
 Nargis
 Azhar Rangeela
 Sana Nawaz
 Deeba
 Naghma

Soundtrack 1998 film

Crew

Reception

Box office

See also
 List of highest-grossing Pakistani films
 List of Pakistani films of 1963
 List of Pakistani films of 1998

References

External links 
 

1963 films
Punjabi-language Pakistani films
1990s Punjabi-language films
1998 films
1990s romantic action films
Films directed by Syed Noor
Pakistani romantic comedy films
Pakistani action comedy films